Mikhaylovsky (masculine), Mikhaylovskaya (feminine), or Mikhaylovskoye (neuter) is the name of several rural localities in Russia.

Altai Krai
As of 2010, one rural locality in Altai Krai bears this name:
Mikhaylovskoye, Altai Krai, a selo in Mikhaylovsky Selsoviet of Mikhaylovsky District

Arkhangelsk Oblast
As of 2010, six rural localities in Arkhangelsk Oblast bear this name:
Mikhaylovskaya, Kargopolsky District, Arkhangelsk Oblast, a village in Tikhmangsky Selsoviet of Kargopolsky District
Mikhaylovskaya, Rovdinsky Selsoviet, Shenkursky District, Arkhangelsk Oblast, a village in Rovdinsky Selsoviet of Shenkursky District
Mikhaylovskaya, Ust-Padengsky Selsoviet, Shenkursky District, Arkhangelsk Oblast, a village in Ust-Padengsky Selsoviet of Shenkursky District
Mikhaylovskaya, Ustyansky District, Arkhangelsk Oblast, a village in Chadromsky Selsoviet of Ustyansky District
Mikhaylovskaya, Verkhnetoyemsky District, Arkhangelsk Oblast, a village in Novovershinsky Selsoviet of Verkhnetoyemsky District
Mikhaylovskaya, Vinogradovsky District, Arkhangelsk Oblast, a village in Boretsky Selsoviet of Vinogradovsky District

Republic of Bashkortostan
As of 2010, one rural locality in the Republic of Bashkortostan bears this name:
Mikhaylovsky, Republic of Bashkortostan, a village in Yermolkinsky Selsoviet of Belebeyevsky District

Belgorod Oblast
As of 2010, one rural locality in Belgorod Oblast bears this name:
Mikhaylovsky, Belgorod Oblast, a khutor in Gubkinsky District

Bryansk Oblast
As of 2010, four rural localities in Bryansk Oblast bear this name:
Mikhaylovsky, Sevsky District, Bryansk Oblast, a settlement in Dobrovodsky Selsoviet of Sevsky District
Mikhaylovsky, Trubchevsky District, Bryansk Oblast, a settlement in Plyuskovsky Selsoviet of Trubchevsky District
Mikhaylovsky, Sosnovobolotsky Selsoviet, Vygonichsky District, Bryansk Oblast, a settlement in Sosnovobolotsky Selsoviet of Vygonichsky District
Mikhaylovsky, Vygonichi Settlement Council, Vygonichsky District, Bryansk Oblast, a settlement in Vygonichi Settlement Council of Vygonichsky District

Ivanovo Oblast
As of 2010, four rural localities in Ivanovo Oblast bear this name:
Mikhaylovskoye, Furmanovsky District, Ivanovo Oblast, a selo in Furmanovsky District
Mikhaylovskoye, Rodnikovsky District, Ivanovo Oblast, a selo in Rodnikovsky District
Mikhaylovskaya, Pestyakovsky District, Ivanovo Oblast, a village in Pestyakovsky District
Mikhaylovskaya, Zavolzhsky District, Ivanovo Oblast, a village in Zavolzhsky District

Kaluga Oblast
As of 2010, four rural localities in Kaluga Oblast bear this name:
Mikhaylovsky, Kuybyshevsky District, Kaluga Oblast, a settlement in Kuybyshevsky District
Mikhaylovsky, Spas-Demensky District, Kaluga Oblast, a khutor in Spas-Demensky District
Mikhaylovskoye, Iznoskovsky District, Kaluga Oblast, a village in Iznoskovsky District
Mikhaylovskoye, Peremyshlsky District, Kaluga Oblast, a village in Peremyshlsky District

Republic of Karelia
As of 2010, one rural locality in the Republic of Karelia bears this name:
Mikhaylovskoye, Republic of Karelia, a selo in Olonetsky District

Kemerovo Oblast
As of 2010, two rural localities in Kemerovo Oblast bear this name:
Mikhaylovsky, Kemerovsky District, Kemerovo Oblast, a settlement in Yelykayevskaya Rural Territory of Kemerovsky District
Mikhaylovsky, Krapivinsky District, Kemerovo Oblast, a settlement in Bannovskaya Rural Territory of Krapivinsky District

Kirov Oblast
As of 2010, one rural locality in Kirov Oblast bears this name:
Mikhaylovskoye, Kirov Oblast, a selo in Mikhaylovsky Rural Okrug of Tuzhinsky District

Kostroma Oblast
As of 2010, three rural localities in Kostroma Oblast bear this name:
Mikhaylovskoye, Antropovsky District, Kostroma Oblast, a selo in Kotelnikovskoye Settlement of Antropovsky District
Mikhaylovskoye, Galichsky District, Kostroma Oblast, a selo in Dmitriyevskoye Settlement of Galichsky District
Mikhaylovskoye, Sudislavsky District, Kostroma Oblast, a village in Raslovskoye Settlement of Sudislavsky District

Krasnodar Krai
As of 2010, two rural localities in Krasnodar Krai bear this name:
Mikhaylovskoye, Krasnodar Krai, a selo in Mikhaylovsky Rural Okrug of Seversky District
Mikhaylovskaya, Krasnodar Krai, a stanitsa in Mikhaylovsky Rural Okrug of Kurganinsky District

Kursk Oblast
As of 2010, one rural locality in Kursk Oblast bears this name:
Mikhaylovsky, Kursk Oblast, a settlement in Razvetyevsky Selsoviet of Zheleznogorsky District

Leningrad Oblast
As of 2010, two rural localities in Leningrad Oblast bear this name:
Mikhaylovsky, Leningrad Oblast, a logging depot settlement in Mginskoye Settlement Municipal Formation of Kirovsky District
Mikhaylovskaya, Leningrad Oblast, a village in Ropshinskoye Settlement Municipal Formation of Lomonosovsky District

Lipetsk Oblast
As of 2010, one rural locality in Lipetsk Oblast bears this name:
Mikhaylovsky, Lipetsk Oblast, a settlement in Menshekolodezsky Selsoviet of Dolgorukovsky District

Republic of Mordovia
As of 2010, one rural locality in the Republic of Mordovia bears this name:
Mikhaylovskoye, Republic of Mordovia, a selo in Bolsheazyassky Selsoviet of Kovylkinsky District

Moscow Oblast
As of 2010, twelve rural localities in Moscow Oblast bear this name:
Mikhaylovskoye, Domodedovo, Moscow Oblast, a selo under the administrative jurisdiction of the Domodedovo Town Under Oblast Jurisdiction
Mikhaylovskoye, Dmitrovsky District, Moscow Oblast, a village in Yakotskoye Rural Settlement of Dmitrovsky District
Mikhaylovskoye, Klinsky District, Moscow Oblast, a village in Nudolskoye Rural Settlement of Klinsky District
Mikhaylovskoye, Borisovskoye Rural Settlement, Mozhaysky District, Moscow Oblast, a village in Borisovskoye Rural Settlement of Mozhaysky District
Mikhaylovskoye, Sputnik Rural Settlement, Mozhaysky District, Moscow Oblast, a village in Sputnik Rural Settlement of Mozhaysky District
Mikhaylovskoye, Odintsovsky District, Moscow Oblast, a selo in Yershovskoye Rural Settlement of Odintsovsky District
Mikhaylovskoye, Podolsky District, Moscow Oblast, a selo in Mikhaylovo-Yartsevskoye Rural Settlement of Podolsky District
Mikhaylovskoye, Pushkinsky District, Moscow Oblast, a village in Tsarevskoye Rural Settlement of Pushkinsky District
Mikhaylovskoye, Ruzsky District, Moscow Oblast, a village in Volkovskoye Rural Settlement of Ruzsky District
Mikhaylovskoye, Shakhovskoy District, Moscow Oblast, a village in Ramenskoye Rural Settlement of Shakhovskoy District
Mikhaylovskoye, Volokolamsky District, Moscow Oblast, a village in Yaropoletskoye Rural Settlement of Volokolamsky District
Mikhaylovskaya, Moscow Oblast, a village in Dmitrovskoye Rural Settlement of Shatursky District

Nizhny Novgorod Oblast
As of 2010, two rural localities in Nizhny Novgorod Oblast bear this name:
Mikhaylovskoye, Chkalovsky District, Nizhny Novgorod Oblast, a selo in Purekhovsky Selsoviet of Chkalovsky District
Mikhaylovskoye, Vorotynsky District, Nizhny Novgorod Oblast, a selo in Mikhaylovsky Selsoviet of Vorotynsky District

Republic of North Ossetia–Alania
As of 2010, one rural locality in the Republic of North Ossetia–Alania bears this name:
Mikhaylovskoye, Republic of North Ossetia–Alania, a selo in Mikhaylovsky Rural Okrug of Prigorodny District

Novgorod Oblast
As of 2010, one rural locality in Novgorod Oblast bears this name:
Mikhaylovskoye, Novgorod Oblast, a village in Peredolskoye Settlement of Batetsky District

Novosibirsk Oblast
As of 2010, one rural locality in Novosibirsk Oblast bears this name:
Mikhaylovsky, Novosibirsk Oblast, a settlement in Chulymsky District

Orenburg Oblast
As of 2010, one rural locality in Orenburg Oblast bears this name:
Mikhaylovsky, Orenburg Oblast, a settlement in Rossiysky Selsoviet of Oktyabrsky District

Oryol Oblast
As of 2010, five rural localities in Oryol Oblast bear this name:
Mikhaylovsky, Dmitrovsky District, Oryol Oblast, a settlement in Druzhensky Selsoviet of Dmitrovsky District
Mikhaylovsky, Kromskoy District, Oryol Oblast, a settlement in Kutafinsky Selsoviet of Kromskoy District
Mikhaylovsky, Livensky District, Oryol Oblast, a settlement in Sergiyevsky Selsoviet of Livensky District
Mikhaylovsky, Orlovsky District, Oryol Oblast, a settlement in Zhilyayevsky Selsoviet of Orlovsky District
Mikhaylovsky, Verkhovsky District, Oryol Oblast, a settlement in Vasilyevsky Selsoviet of Verkhovsky District

Pskov Oblast
As of 2010, one rural locality in Pskov Oblast bears this name:
Mikhaylovskoye, Pskov Oblast, a village in Kunyinsky District

Rostov Oblast
As of 2010, two rural localities in Rostov Oblast bear this name:
Mikhaylovsky, Konstantinovsky District, Rostov Oblast, a khutor under the administrative jurisdiction of Konstantinovskoye Urban Settlement of Konstantinovsky District
Mikhaylovsky, Verkhnedonskoy District, Rostov Oblast, a khutor in Verkhnyakovskoye Rural Settlement of Verkhnedonskoy District

Samara Oblast
As of 2010, one rural locality in Samara Oblast bears this name:
Mikhaylovsky, Samara Oblast, a settlement in Kinelsky District

Saratov Oblast
As of 2010, one rural locality in Saratov Oblast bears this name:
Mikhaylovsky, Saratov Oblast, a closed settlement

Smolensk Oblast
As of 2010, one rural locality in Smolensk Oblast bears this name:
Mikhaylovskoye, Smolensk Oblast, a village in Baklanovskoye Rural Settlement of Demidovsky District

Tula Oblast
As of 2010, nine rural localities in Tula Oblast bear this name:
Mikhaylovsky, Chernsky District, Tula Oblast, a settlement in Popovskaya Rural Administration of Chernsky District
Mikhaylovsky, Kamensky District, Tula Oblast, a settlement in Sitovsky Rural Okrug of Kamensky District
Mikhaylovsky, Kimovsky District, Tula Oblast, a settlement in Khitrovshchinsky Rural Okrug of Kimovsky District
Mikhaylovsky, Kurkinsky District, Tula Oblast, a settlement in Mikhaylovskaya Volost of Kurkinsky District
Mikhaylovsky, Suvorovsky District, Tula Oblast, a settlement in Krasnomikhaylovskaya Rural Territory of Suvorovsky District
Mikhaylovsky, Volovsky District, Tula Oblast, a settlement in Krasnodubrovsky Rural Okrug of Volovsky District
Mikhaylovsky, Yefremovsky District, Tula Oblast, a settlement in Lobanovsky Rural Okrug of Yefremovsky District
Mikhaylovskoye, Plavsky District, Tula Oblast, a selo in Gorbachevsky Rural Okrug of Plavsky District
Mikhaylovskoye, Yasnogorsky District, Tula Oblast, a village in Pervomayskaya Rural Territory of Yasnogorsky District

Tver Oblast
As of 2010, seven rural localities in Tver Oblast bear this name:
Mikhaylovskoye (Vypolzovskoye Rural Settlement), Bologovsky District, Tver Oblast, a village in Bologovsky District; municipally, a part of Vypolzovskoye Rural Settlement of that district
Mikhaylovskoye (Valdayskoye Rural Settlement), Bologovsky District, Tver Oblast, a village in Bologovsky District; municipally, a part of Valdayskoye Rural Settlement of that district
Mikhaylovskoye, Kalininsky District, Tver Oblast, a selo in Kalininsky District
Mikhaylovskoye, Lesnoy District, Tver Oblast, a selo in Lesnoy District
Mikhaylovskoye, Likhoslavlsky District, Tver Oblast, a village in Likhoslavlsky District
Mikhaylovskoye, Molokovsky District, Tver Oblast, a village in Molokovsky District
Mikhaylovskoye, Toropetsky District, Tver Oblast, a village in Toropetsky District

Udmurt Republic
As of 2010, one rural locality in the Udmurt Republic bears this name:
Mikhaylovsky, Udmurt Republic, a pochinok in Shaberdinsky Selsoviet of Zavyalovsky District

Vladimir Oblast
As of 2010, one rural locality in Vladimir Oblast bears this name:
Mikhaylovskaya, Vladimir Oblast, a village in Gorokhovetsky District

Volgograd Oblast
As of 2010, one rural locality in Volgograd Oblast bears this name:
Mikhaylovskaya, Volgograd Oblast, a stanitsa in Mikhaylovsky Selsoviet of Uryupinsky District

Vologda Oblast
As of 2010, ten rural localities in Vologda Oblast bear this name:
Mikhaylovskoye, Cherepovetsky District, Vologda Oblast, a village in Shchetinsky Selsoviet of Cherepovetsky District
Mikhaylovskoye, Kharovsky District, Vologda Oblast, a selo in Mikhaylovsky Selsoviet of Kharovsky District
Mikhaylovskoye, Sheksninsky District, Vologda Oblast, a village in Churovsky Selsoviet of Sheksninsky District
Mikhaylovskoye, Ustyuzhensky District, Vologda Oblast, a selo in Ustyuzhensky Selsoviet of Ustyuzhensky District
Mikhaylovskaya, Kaduysky District, Vologda Oblast, a village in Nikolsky Selsoviet of Kaduysky District
Mikhaylovskaya, Tarnogsky District, Vologda Oblast, a village in Ozeretsky Selsoviet of Tarnogsky District
Mikhaylovskaya, Ust-Kubinsky District, Vologda Oblast, a village in Troitsky Selsoviet of Ust-Kubinsky District
Mikhaylovskaya, Velikoustyugsky District, Vologda Oblast, a village in Pokrovsky Selsoviet of Velikoustyugsky District
Mikhaylovskaya, Verkhovazhsky District, Vologda Oblast, a village in Morozovsky Selsoviet of Verkhovazhsky District
Mikhaylovskaya, Vozhegodsky District, Vologda Oblast, a village in Ramensky Selsoviet of Vozhegodsky District

Voronezh Oblast
As of 2010, four rural localities in Voronezh Oblast bear this name:
Mikhaylovsky, Liskinsky District, Voronezh Oblast, a khutor in Petrovskoye Rural Settlement of Liskinsky District
Mikhaylovsky, Novokhopyorsky District, Voronezh Oblast, a settlement in Mikhaylovskoye Rural Settlement of Novokhopyorsky District
Mikhaylovsky, Paninsky District, Voronezh Oblast, a settlement in Mikhaylovskoye Rural Settlement of Paninsky District
Mikhaylovsky, Talovsky District, Voronezh Oblast, a settlement in Voznesenovskoye Rural Settlement of Talovsky District

Yaroslavl Oblast
As of 2010, nine rural localities in Yaroslavl Oblast bear this name:
Mikhaylovsky, Yaroslavl Oblast, a settlement in Nekrasovsky Rural Okrug of Yaroslavsky District
Mikhaylovskoye, Breytovsky District, Yaroslavl Oblast, a village in Pokrovo-Sitsky Rural Okrug of Breytovsky District
Mikhaylovskoye, Lyubimsky District, Yaroslavl Oblast, a selo in Osetsky Rural Okrug of Lyubimsky District
Mikhaylovskoye, Nekrasovsky District, Yaroslavl Oblast, a selo in Burmakinsky Rural Okrug of Nekrasovsky District
Mikhaylovskoye, Rostovsky District, Yaroslavl Oblast, a village in Nikolsky Rural Okrug of Rostovsky District
Mikhaylovskoye, Rybinsky District, Yaroslavl Oblast, a selo in Mikhaylovsky Rural Okrug of Rybinsky District
Mikhaylovskoye, Tutayevsky District, Yaroslavl Oblast, a village in Chebakovsky Rural Okrug of Tutayevsky District
Mikhaylovskoye, Kurbsky Rural Okrug, Yaroslavsky District, Yaroslavl Oblast, a selo in Kurbsky Rural Okrug of Yaroslavsky District
Mikhaylovskoye, Tochishchensky Rural Okrug, Yaroslavsky District, Yaroslavl Oblast, a village in Tochishchensky Rural Okrug of Yaroslavsky District

See also
5-go otdeleniya sovkhoza "Mikhaylovsky", a rural locality (a settlement) in Mikhaylovskoye Rural Settlement of Paninsky District of Voronezh Oblast